Edwin Burr Babbitt (July 26, 1862 – December 9, 1939) was a major general in the United States Army.

Biography
Babbitt was born at Watervliet Arsenal in Watervliet, New York on July 26, 1862, to Lawrence Sprague Babbitt, a U.S. Army Colonel, and Francis P. "Fannie" (McDougall) Babbitt. He was the grandson of Charles McDougall and nephew of Thomas Mower McDougall.

Babbitt died on December 9, 1939, in Santa Barbara, California. He is buried at Arlington National Cemetery.

Career
Babbitt graduated from the United States Military Academy in 1884 and was commissioned a second lieutenant. He served as a brigade commander during the Meuse-Argonne Offensive and the Battle of Saint-Mihiel during World War I. Awards he received include the Army Distinguished Service Medal for "exceptionally meritorious and conspicuous services" in World War I; Officer, Legion d'Honour (France); Comendator, Order of the Sun of Peru (Peru) and Order of Abdon Calderón, First Class (Ecuador). He retired in 1924.

References

Bibliography

1862 births
1939 deaths
United States Army Field Artillery Branch personnel
People from Watervliet, New York
United States Military Academy alumni
United States Army generals of World War I
United States Army generals
Recipients of the Distinguished Service Medal (US Army)
Officiers of the Légion d'honneur
Recipients of the Order of the Sun of Peru
Burials at Arlington National Cemetery